Tōhoku Shinseien Sanatorium or National Sanatorium Tōhoku Shinseien is a sanatorium for leprosy or ex-leprosy patients situated in Tome-shi, Miyagi-ken, Japan, founded in 1939.

History

Background
Following prefectural sanatoriums, the Japanese Government decided to increase sanatoriums, starting with National Sanatorium Nagashima Aiseien Nagashima Aiseien Sanatorium in 1930. Tohoku Shinseien Sanatorium was the 6th sanatorium which was established in 1939.

Tohoku Shinseien Sanatorium
In October, 1939, National Sanatorium Tohoku Shinseien was established.
Apr 1996:The 1953 Leprosy Prevention Law was abolished.
Jul 1998: The trial for compensation started.
May 11, 2001: The trial for compensation ruled that the previous Leprosy Prevention was unconstitutional.
May 25, 2001: The trial for compensation was confirmed. The compensation of 8,000,000 yen to 14,000,000 yen was given to patients depending on the duration of unconstitutional periods.

Number of Patients at the end of the fiscal year
The number of in-patients is the sum of patients which changed not only by the newly diagnosed hospitalized and those who died among in-patients, by other factors such as the number of patients who escaped or were discharged, depending on the condition of the times. Recently they were encouraged to be discharged, but the long period of the segregation policy causing leprosy stigma might influence the number of those who went into the society. 
the end of the fiscal year is the March 31, next year

The number of healed, discharged patients

Museum
On June 26, 2006, "Shinsei Museum" opened with various historical materials concerning patients' life in previous days of the Sanatorium in the classroom of the branch school of Hanokizawa within the Sanatorium. Its purpose is to reduce leprosy stigma. It is open between 10 a.m. and 3 p.m. on weekdays.

Notes

References
Leprosy and society(1986), Kon S. J. Iwate med Ass 38,2,161-174.(In Japanese)
Leprosy in Japan
Dr.Kamikawa Yutaka in Japanese

External links
Shinseien Leprosarium HP in Japanese

Hospital buildings completed in 1939
Hospitals in Japan
Leper hospitals
Hospitals established in 1939
Leprosy in Japan
1939 establishments in Japan